Muhammad Nadeem Ahmed (also Muhammad Nadeem, ; born 5 March 1972 in Gojra, Punjab) is a retired Pakistani field hockey player. He represented Pakistan in two editions of the Olympic Games (2000 and 2004), and he has served as a full-fledged member and single-time captain of the national field hockey team throughout his sporting career.

Nadeem made his official debut at the 2000 Summer Olympics in Sydney, where he and the Pakistanis missed a chance to claim a bronze medal against the Aussies in the men's field hockey tournament with an official score of 3–6.

At the 2004 Summer Olympics in Athens, Nadeem qualified for the second time as a member of the Pakistani squad in the men's field hockey after receiving a wild card invitation from the Olympic Qualifying Tournament in Madrid, Spain. Narrowly missing out a slot for the semifinals by two points, Nadeem helped the Pakistanis scored a goal of 4–2 to defeat the notorious New Zealand team in the fifth place classification match. Serving as the team captain in field hockey, Nadeem was also appointed by the Pakistan Olympic Association to carry the Pakistani flag in the opening ceremony.

Shortly after his second Olympics, Nadeem announced his official retirement from international hockey after intense pressures escalated him from the team's fifth-place finish at the concluded Games.

References

External links

1972 births
Living people
People from Toba Tek Singh District
Pakistani male field hockey players
Olympic field hockey players of Pakistan
Field hockey players at the 2000 Summer Olympics
Field hockey players at the 2004 Summer Olympics
1998 Men's Hockey World Cup players
2002 Men's Hockey World Cup players
Asian Games medalists in field hockey
Field hockey players at the 1998 Asian Games
Field hockey players at the 2002 Asian Games
Commonwealth Games medallists in field hockey
Commonwealth Games bronze medallists for Pakistan
Asian Games bronze medalists for Pakistan
Medalists at the 1998 Asian Games
Beeston Hockey Club players
Field hockey players at the 2002 Commonwealth Games
Medallists at the 2002 Commonwealth Games